Sergei Isidorovich Romanov (born January 14, 1897 in Moscow; died August 20, 1970 in Moscow) was an association football player.

International career
Romanov made his debut for Russian Empire on September 14, 1913 in a friendly against Norway.

External links
  Profile

1897 births
1970 deaths
Russian footballers
Russia international footballers
Association football forwards